Bajana is a village in Tehsil Buxwaha in Chhatarpur district of Madhya Pradesh, India.

Notes 

Chhatarpur
Villages in Chhatarpur district